The world record loop is the record for the highest number of aircraft to successfully complete an aerobatic loop while flying in formation. The current record is 22 aircraft. The record was set by the Royal Air Force aerobatic team, the Black Arrows, who successfully looped 22 Hawker Hunter jet aircraft every day of the September 1958 Society of British Aerospace Companies Farnborough Airshow, beating the previous record set by the Pakistan Air Force, who looped the 16 North American F-86 Sabres in February 1958.
The record required the team to train pilots from other RAF squadrons. The team initially wanted to loop 20 aircraft, but additional aircraft were added to the formation in order to improve the formation's aesthetic appearance.

History

Pakistani Record

British Record 
In September 1958 the Black Arrows of No. 111 Squadron RAF were due to appear at the 1958 SBAC Air Show at Farnborough as the premier RAF Aerobatic team. Their Commanding Officer SqnLdr Roger L. Topp was about to hand over command of Treble-one squadron to SqnLdr Peter Latham and had requested permission from the  RAF hierarchy to attempt to break the current world record for the number of aircraft to complete a loop, held since February 1958 by the Pakistan Air Force who had successfully looped 16 North American F-86 Sabres.

Permission for the attempt was received and a number of pilots and aircraft needed to complete the formation were seconded from other RAF fighter squadrons to practice for the show. Initially Topp intended to loop 20 aircraft in five lines of four aircraft. Having four aircraft in each line introduced difficulties for the pilots in the rear aircraft who became "thrust limited" over the peak of the loop and would lose position. Topp then decided to make the formation 7 lines of three aircraft. After this was trialled successfully, a fourth aircraft was added to the centre line to improve the aesthetics of the formation and the "22 Hunter Loop" formation was born.

Each day of the Farnborouh show, the Black Arrows would start their display with the enormous formation of 22 Hawker Hunter F6's completing two consecutive loops; A world record which has never been equalled. After the loops, six outer aircraft would break off from the formation and the Black Arrows would return for a 16 aircraft roll, another unprecedented feat which, though subsequently equalled by other teams, remains unsurpassed.

Pilots and planes
The pilots and aircraft who were involved in the record-breaking loop are listed below.

XG194 SqnLdr Roger Topp
XG170 FltLt "Oakie" Oakford
XG200 FlgOff Marcus"Oscar" Wild
XF515 FltLt Alan Brindle
XG201 FltLt Patrick Hine
XG171 FltLt Brian Mercer
XG592 FltLt George Ord
XE563 FltLt Matthew Kemp
XJ715 FlgOff Ron Smith
XG189 FltLt Bob Smith
XF416 FltLt Bob Barcilon
XF424 FlgOff Roger Hymans
XE616 FlgOff Peter Jennings
XG190 FltLt Les Swart
XE656 FlgOff Norman Lamb
XE584 FltLt "Will" Scarlett
XG193 FlgOff "CJ" Clayton-Jones
XJ687 FltLt "Chas" Boyer
XG266 FltLt Frank Travers-Smith
XG160 FltLt Mike Thurley
XF506 FlgOff Tony Aldridge
XG191 FltLt David Edmondston

Airborne Spares:

FltLt Channing Biss
FlgOff Barry Vaughan

Extra pilots:

FltLt Les Elgey
FltLt Fred Hartley

References

1958 in aviation
History of Pakistan